Darul Ihsan University or DIU was a private university in Dhaka, Bangladesh. It was founded by late Syed Ali Ashraf in 1989. The government of Bangladesh accredited it as a private university in 1993. The Education Ministry shut down the university on 26 July 2016 for illegally operating numerous branch campuses and for selling higher degree certificates.

Areas of studies

Faculties

 Faculty of Religious Sciences
 Faculty of Human Sciences
 Faculty of Natural Sciences
 Faculty of Business Administration

Departments

Convocation
 1st Convocation was held on 13 March 1997 in the BaliBhadra, Savar, Dhaka. The number of graduating students was 244.
 2nd Convocation was held on 27 March 2002 in the Bangladesh National Museum, Dhaka. The number of graduating students was 601.
 3rd Convocation was held on 21 December 2003 in the Bangladesh China Friendship Conference Center, Sher-e Bangla Nagar, Dhaka.

Controversy

University Grants Commission (UGC) warns students and their parents to be careful about admission in Darul Ihsan University of Bangladesh. Md. Shamsul Alam, Director, Private University Division, University of Grants Commission of Bangladesh certify that Darul Ihsan University has the approval of the Ministry of Education, Government of the people's Republic of Bangladesh on 19/08/1993. Its only approved campus by the Government and UGC is House No. 21, Road No. 9/A, Dhanmondi R/A, Dhaka-1209. Certificates, if any, issued from its approved campus to any of its students after completion of the works and fulfillment of all the requirements of the above programme, will be considered legally valid. The awarded degree from the private university is equivalent to a degree obtained from any public university of Bangladesh. But the authorities of this university are now divided in four separate groups and running their activities form different campuses. As of August 2017, the university was functioning under stay order from the court. The university is legally closed.

References

External links 
  – official website
  – DIU in UGC's website

Dhanmondi
Educational institutions established in 1989
Educational institutions established in 1993
Private universities in Bangladesh
Universities and colleges in Dhaka
Defunct universities and colleges
1989 establishments in Bangladesh
1993 establishments in Bangladesh